A backshunt is a railway track configuration in situations where a change in (almost opposite) direction is required and a traditional curve cannot fit.

There are two main applications of a backshunt.
 To climb or drop a steep incline using a Zig zag (railway)
 To change direction on to a parallel track, often used in industrial sidings.

Example Backshunts
 Part of the old Cleator and Workington Junction Railway was maintained in Rowrah as a backshunt from Rowrah Head Quarry on to the Whitehaven, Cleator and Egremont Railway. (Google Maps Overlay)

See also
Headshunt

References

Railway track layouts